The 2000 Presidents Cup was held between October 19 and 22, 2000. It was played at the Robert Trent Jones Golf Club in Gainesville, Virginia, U.S. The United States team won the competition by a margin of 21–10. The honorary chairman was American President Bill Clinton.

Format
Both teams had 12 players plus a non-playing captain. The competition was four days long unlike the past three tournaments where there were three days of competition. The same number of matches were still played though. On the first day foursomes were played. On the second day four-ball and foursomes was played. On the third day four-ball was played. On the fourth and final day singles were played.

Teams

OWGR as of October 15, 2000, the last ranking before the Cup

Thursday's matches
All matches played were foursomes.

Friday's matches

Morning four-ball

Afternoon foursomes

Saturday's matches
All matches played were four-ball.

Sunday's matches

Singles

Individual player records
Each entry refers to the win–loss–half record of the player.

United States

International

External links
Official scores

Presidents Cup
Golf in Virginia
Presidents Cup
Presidents Cup
Presidents Cup
Presidents Cup